James W. Wahner (born November 10, 1939) is a retired American government administrator and Democratic politician.  He served 9 years in the Wisconsin State Assembly, representing Milwaukee County, and was majority leader from January 1977 until his resignation in January 1980.  He left the Assembly to serve as Midwest Regional Director of the Federal Emergency Management Agency in the administration of U.S. President Jimmy Carter.

Biography

Wahner was born in Milwaukee, Wisconsin.  He graduated from Mercer High School and served in the United States Army from 1959 to 1962.  He received his bachelor's degree from American University in 1966 and his master's degree in political science from University of Wisconsin–Milwaukee. He also took graduate classes for his doctorate at University of Wisconsin–Milwaukee and also taught there. He was an aide to the mayor of Milwaukee and was a Democrat. Wahner served in the Wisconsin Assembly from 1971 to 1980. In the 1992 Wisconsin Spring Primary Election, Wahner ran for Milwaukee County Executive and lost the election.

References

|-

|-

|-

1939 births
Living people
Politicians from Milwaukee
Military personnel from Milwaukee
American University alumni
University of Wisconsin–Milwaukee alumni
University of Wisconsin–Milwaukee faculty
Democratic Party members of the Wisconsin State Assembly